Le Touquet – Côte d'Opale Airport  is  east-southeast of Le Touquet, a commune of the Pas-de-Calais department on the coast of northern France.

In September 2022, it was announced by Emmanuel Macron that the airport would be renamed in honour of Queen Elizabeth II.

The passenger terminal is open from 09:00-20:00 hours. There are three flying clubs and most of them also give flying lessons; two of them are helicopter schools and clubs.

Airlines and destinations
As of November 2018, there are no more scheduled services after the only operator, LyddAir, ceased its route to Lydd.

Statistics

Accidents and incidents
 On 2 May 1981, Aer Lingus Flight 164, a Boeing 737-200 carrying 108 passengers and crew, was hijacked on a flight from Dublin Airport in Ireland to London Heathrow Airport in the United Kingdom. The hijacker had the pilots fly the aircraft to Le Touquet where it then stood for nearly 10 hours before French armed forces troops stormed the aircraft and apprehended the suspect. No one was killed or injured.

Appearances in media
 Le Touquet airport is featured in the Microsoft Flight Simulator X mission Flying Blind Across The Channel, in which the player flies a Cessna 172 from Manston Airport in Kent, UK on a foggy day using instrument flight rules.

References

External links
Aéroport Le Touquet Côte d'Opale - official site
 Aéroport de Le Touquet - Côte d'Opale (LTQ / LFAT) at Union des Aéroports Français

Airports in Hauts-de-France
Le Touquet